The Gyeogam Yurok (격암유록), also known as the Namsago Prophecy (남사고예언서), is a book allegedly written by the Joseon scholar Nam Sago (1509–1571) who styled himself "Gyeogam".

Author 
Nam Sago (1509–1571) was a scholar of the Joseon period of Korea, who styled himself Gyeogam. He was well versed in mechanics, feng shui, astronomy, martial arts, and physiognomy. He was known for poems and prose with prophetic intents.

Book 
In 1977, Lee Do-eun published a book titled Gyeogam Yurok containing a set of prophecies attributed to Nam Sago.

These prophecies supposedly unveiled the mysteries of 450 years of Korean history, forecasting many events of the past such as the Imjin War, the Donghak Peasant Revolution, and the Korea-Japan Consolidation Treaty, as well as the liberation and division of the Korean Peninsula, the Korean War, the 4·19 Revolution and the 5·16 military coup d'état. 

In 1995, Kim Hawon criticized the book as a forgery; many of its elements have been branded as anachronisms.

In any case, a copy of this book is kept in the National Library of Korea.

Notes

References
 Doopedia    
 AKS  
 EncyKor 
 
 *

External links 
 Secret Predictions of Nam Sago

16th-century books
Korean-language literature
Prophecy
Forgery controversies